The Hyundai Delta family is the company's smaller V6 engine, ranging from . Both share the same  stroke and both are DOHC designs.

2.0L (G6BP)
The G6BP (also called the 2.0 D) is the  version.

Applications
 Hyundai Grandeur/XG (XG) (1998–2005)

2.5L (G6BV/G6BW)
The G6BW/G6BV (also called the 2.5 D) is the  version in a 90˚ configuration with an  bore. It made its first appearance in the 1999 EF series Sonata.

Applications
 Hyundai Grandeur/XG (XG) (1998–2005)
 Hyundai Sonata (EF) (1998–2001)
 Kia Optima (MS) (2000–2001)

2.7L (G6BA)
The G6BA/G6BAX/G6BAY (also called the 2.7 D) is the larger  version available in either 60˚ or 90˚ configuration with an  bore. It has an aluminum engine block and aluminum DOHC cylinder heads. It uses Multi-port fuel injection, has 4 valves per cylinder, and features powder metal-forged, fracture-split connecting rods.

Applications
 Hyundai Grandeur/XG (XG) (1998–2005)
 Hyundai Santa Fe (SM) (2000–2009)
 Hyundai Sonata (EF) (2001–2004)
 Hyundai Tiburon/Coupe (GK) (2001–2008)
 Hyundai Trajet (1999–2008)
 Hyundai Tucson (JM) (2004–2009)
 Kia Opirus (2003–2006)
 Kia Optima (MS/MG) (2001–2006)
 Kia Sportage (KM) (2004–2010)

2.7L LPG (L6BA)
The L6BA (also called the 2.7 LPG) is the LPG version of the 2.7L petrol engine.

Applications
 Hyundai Santa Fe (SM) (2000–2005)
 Hyundai Trajet (1999–2007)

Race engines

Applications
 Oullim Spirra

See also
 List of Hyundai engines

References

Delta
V6 engines
Gasoline engines by model